Statistics of the Primera División de México for the 1965–66 season.

Overview

Ciudad Madero was promoted to Primera División.

The season was contested by 16 teams, and America won the championship.

Zacatepec was relegated to Segunda División.

Teams

League standings

Results

References
Mexico - List of final tables (RSSSF)

1965-66
Mex
1965–66 in Mexican football